In statistical inference, specifically predictive inference, a prediction interval is an estimate of an interval in which a future observation will fall, with a certain probability, given what has already been observed. Prediction intervals are often used in regression analysis.

Prediction intervals are used in both frequentist statistics and Bayesian statistics: a prediction interval bears the same relationship to a future observation that a frequentist confidence interval or Bayesian credible interval bears to an unobservable population parameter: prediction intervals predict the distribution of individual future points, whereas confidence intervals and credible intervals of parameters predict the distribution of estimates of the true population mean or other quantity of interest that cannot be observed.

Introduction 
For example, if one makes the parametric assumption that the underlying distribution is a normal distribution, and has a sample set {X1, ..., Xn}, then confidence intervals and credible intervals may be used to estimate the population mean μ and population standard deviation σ of the underlying population, while prediction intervals may be used to estimate the value of the next sample variable, Xn+1.

Alternatively, in Bayesian terms, a prediction interval can be described as a credible interval for the variable itself, rather than for a parameter of the distribution thereof.

The concept of prediction intervals need not be restricted to inference about a single future sample value but can be extended to more complicated cases. For example, in the context of river flooding where analyses are often based on annual values of the largest flow within the year, there may be interest in making inferences about the largest flood likely to be experienced within the next 50 years.

Since prediction intervals are only concerned with past and future observations, rather than unobservable population parameters, they are advocated as a better method than confidence intervals by some statisticians, such as Seymour Geisser, following the focus on observables by Bruno de Finetti.

Normal distribution 
Given a sample from a normal distribution, whose parameters are unknown, it is possible to give prediction intervals in the frequentist sense, i.e., an interval [a, b] based on statistics of the sample such that on repeated experiments, Xn+1 falls in the interval the desired percentage of the time; one may call these "predictive confidence intervals".

A general technique of frequentist prediction intervals is to find and compute a pivotal quantity of the observables X1, ..., Xn, Xn+1 – meaning a function of observables and parameters whose probability distribution does not depend on the parameters – that can be inverted to give a probability of the future observation Xn+1 falling in some interval computed in terms of the observed values so far,  Such a pivotal quantity, depending only on observables, is called an ancillary statistic. The usual method of constructing pivotal quantities is to take the difference of two variables that depend on location, so that location cancels out, and then take the ratio of two variables that depend on scale, so that scale cancels out.
The most familiar pivotal quantity is the Student's t-statistic, which can be derived by this method and is used in the sequel.

Known mean, known variance 
A prediction interval [ℓ,u] for a future observation X in a normal distribution N(µ,σ2) with known mean and variance may be calculated from

where , the standard score of X, is distributed as  standard normal.

Hence

or

with z the quantile in the standard normal distribution for which:

or equivalently;

The prediction interval is conventionally written  as:

For example, to calculate the 95% prediction interval for a normal distribution with a mean (µ) of 5 and a standard deviation (σ) of 1, then z is approximately 2. Therefore, the lower limit of the prediction interval is approximately 5 ‒ (2·1) = 3, and the upper limit is approximately 5 + (2·1) = 7, thus giving a prediction interval of approximately 3 to 7.

Estimation of parameters 
For a distribution with unknown parameters, a direct approach to prediction is to estimate the parameters and then use the associated quantile function – for example, one could use the sample mean  as estimate for μ and the sample variance s2 as an estimate for σ2. Note that there are two natural choices for s2 here – dividing by  yields an unbiased estimate, while dividing by n yields the maximum likelihood estimator, and either might be used. One then uses the quantile function with these estimated parameters  to give a prediction interval.

This approach is usable, but the resulting interval will not have the repeated sampling interpretation – it is not a predictive confidence interval.

For the sequel, use the sample mean:

and the (unbiased) sample variance:

Unknown mean, known variance 
Given a normal distribution with unknown mean μ but known variance 1, the sample mean  of the observations  has distribution  while the future observation  has distribution  Taking the difference of these cancels the μ and yields a normal distribution of variance  thus

Solving for  gives the prediction distribution  from which one can compute intervals as before. This is a predictive confidence interval in the sense that if one uses a quantile range of 100p%, then on repeated applications of this computation, the future observation  will fall in the predicted interval 100p% of the time.

Notice that this prediction distribution is more conservative than using the estimated mean  and known variance 1, as this uses variance , hence yields wider intervals. This is necessary for the desired confidence interval property to hold.

Known mean, unknown variance 
Conversely, given a normal distribution with known mean 0 but unknown variance , 
the sample variance  of the observations  has, up to scale, a  distribution; more precisely:

while the future observation  has distribution 
Taking the ratio of the future observation and the sample standard deviation  cancels the σ, yielding a Student's t-distribution with n – 1 degrees of freedom:

 

Solving for  gives the prediction distribution  from which one can compute intervals as before.

Notice that this prediction distribution is more conservative than using a normal distribution with the estimated standard deviation  and known mean 0, as it uses the t-distribution instead of the normal distribution, hence yields wider intervals. This is necessary for the desired confidence interval property to hold.

Unknown mean, unknown variance 
Combining the above for a normal distribution  with both μ and σ2 unknown yields the following ancillary statistic:

This simple combination is possible because the sample mean and sample variance of the normal distribution are independent statistics; this is only true for the normal distribution, and in fact characterizes the normal distribution.

Solving for  yields the prediction distribution 

The probability of  falling in a given interval is then:

where Ta is the 100((1 − p)/2)th percentile of Student's t-distribution with n − 1 degrees of freedom.  Therefore, the numbers

Non-parametric methods 

One can compute prediction intervals without any assumptions on the population; formally, this is a non-parametric method. If one has a sample of identical random variables {X1, ..., Xn}, then the probability that the next observation Xn+1 will be the largest is 1/(n + 1), since all observations have equal probability of being the maximum. In the same way, the probability that Xn+1 will be the smallest is 1/(n + 1). The other (n − 1)/(n + 1) of the time, Xn+1 falls between the sample maximum and sample minimum of the sample {X1, ..., Xn}. Thus, denoting the sample maximum and minimum by M and m, this yields an (n − 1)/(n + 1) prediction interval of [m, M].

Notice that while this gives the probability that a future observation will fall in a range, it does not give any estimate as to where in a segment it will fall – notably, if it falls outside the range of observed values, it may be far outside the range. See extreme value theory for further discussion. Formally, this applies not just to sampling from a population, but to any exchangeable sequence of random variables, not necessarily independent or identically distributed.

Contrast with other intervals

Contrast with confidence intervals 

Rather than using sample statistics as estimators of population parameters and applying confidence intervals to these estimates, one considers "the next sample"  as itself a statistic, and computes its sampling distribution.

In parameter confidence intervals, one estimates population parameters; if one wishes to interpret this as prediction of the next sample, one models "the next sample" as a draw from this estimated population, using the (estimated) population distribution. By contrast, in predictive confidence intervals, one uses the sampling distribution of (a statistic of) a sample of n or n + 1 observations from such a population, and the population distribution is not directly used, though the assumption about its form (though not the values of its parameters) is used in computing the sampling distribution.

Contrast with tolerance intervals

Applications
Prediction intervals are commonly used as definitions of reference ranges, such as reference ranges for blood tests to give an idea of whether a blood test is normal or not. For this purpose, the most commonly used prediction interval is the 95% prediction interval, and a reference range based on it can be called a standard reference range.

Regression analysis 

A common application of prediction intervals is to regression analysis.

Suppose the data is being modeled by a straight line regression:

(the point on the regression line), while the actual response would be

The point estimate  is called the mean response, and is an estimate of the expected value of yd, 

A prediction interval instead gives an interval in which one expects yd to fall; this is not necessary if the actual parameters α and β are known (together with the error term εi), but if one is estimating from a sample, then one may use the standard error of the estimates for the intercept and slope ( and ), as well as their correlation, to compute a prediction interval.

In regression,  makes a distinction between intervals for predictions of the mean response vs. for predictions of observed response—affecting essentially the inclusion or not of the unity term within the square root in the expansion factors above; for details, see .

Bayesian statistics 

Seymour Geisser, a proponent of predictive inference, gives predictive applications of Bayesian statistics.

In Bayesian statistics, one can compute (Bayesian) prediction intervals from the posterior probability of the random variable, as a credible interval. In theoretical work, credible intervals are not often calculated for the prediction of future events, but for inference of parameters – i.e., credible intervals of a parameter, not for the outcomes of the variable itself. However, particularly where applications are concerned with possible extreme values of yet to be observed cases, credible intervals for such values can be of practical importance.

See also

Extrapolation
Posterior probability
Prediction
Prediction band
Seymour Geisser
Statistical model validation
Trend estimation

Notes

References

Further reading

 ISO 16269-8 Standard Interpretation of Data, Part 8, Determination of Prediction Intervals

Statistical forecasting
Regression analysis
Statistical intervals